WPA Stock Barn and Pavilion, also known as the Rock Barn, is a historic barn and pavilion located at Trenton, Grundy County, Missouri.  It was built in 1938 as a Works Progress Administration project.  It consists of a two-story, octagonal barn with attached one-story stock pens.  The building is constructed of native stone on a concrete foundation. The building served as a livestock housing and sales pavilion for the annual Grundy County agricultural fair.

It was listed on the National Register of Historic Places in 1994.

References

Octagon barns in the United States
Works Progress Administration in Missouri
Barns on the National Register of Historic Places in Missouri
Buildings and structures completed in 1938
Buildings and structures in Grundy County, Missouri
National Register of Historic Places in Grundy County, Missouri